Ellen Parker (born September 30, 1949) is an American actress, best known for her role as Maureen Bauer in Guiding Light (1986-1993).

Stage work
Parker is primarily a New York stage actress. Among her credits was the original production of The Heidi Chronicles, as well as Equus, David Hare's Plenty, and the play "Strangers". She also had a role in the film Kramer vs. Kramer.

Television credits
Parker's first television appearance was in the PBS adaptation of another one of Wasserstein's works, Uncommon Women and Others. Her first major television role was as Ethel Kennedy in the miniseries Kennedy in 1983. Among her other television credits are appearances on Law & Order and Law & Order: Special Victims Unit, as well as The Education of Max Bickford and Ed.

Guiding Light
Parker is perhaps best known for her role as Maureen Reardon Bauer on Guiding Light, which she played from 1986 to 1993. She replaced Ellen Dolan in the role of Maureen in 1986, and played the role for seven years. During that time, the show's tentpole character, Bert Bauer, died when actress Charita Bauer, who played Bert, died. Maureen then became the show's matriarchal figure. In 1993, then-executive producer Jill Farren Phelps made a surprising decision to kill the character of Maureen, based on lackluster responses to the character during a focus group session. Parker's performance during her character's death (Maureen died in a car accident after discovered her husband Ed had been unfaithful) earned her a Daytime Emmy Award in 1993. She subsequently returned to the show in 1997, 1998, 1999, 2004 and 2005 for flashback scenes and moments where Maureen appeared as a spirit. The character's death, and Parker's departure from the show, proved controversial and unpopular.

Personal life
Parker is New York City based and tends to take mostly New York-based roles. Ms. Parker is a graduate of Bard College. She and her ex- husband Dr. Mack Lipkin, a physician, have one child, a daughter, whom they adopted from China.

Filmography

Awards and nominations

References

External links
 
 

1949 births
Living people
American soap opera actresses
American stage actresses
Bard College alumni
Daytime Emmy Award winners
Daytime Emmy Award for Outstanding Supporting Actress in a Drama Series winners
21st-century American actresses